American duo Macklemore & Ryan Lewis received seven nominations at the 56th Annual Grammy Awards, winning four categories, including Best New Artist, Best Rap Album (The Heist), Best Rap Song and Best Rap Performance ("Thrift Shop").

American Music Awards
The American Music Awards, (AMA) is an annual music awards show, created by Dick Clark in 1973 for ABC when the networks contract to present the Grammy Awards expired. Unlike the Grammys, which are awarded on the basis of votes by members of the Recording Academy, the AMAs are determined by a poll of the public and music buyers. Macklemore & Ryan Lewis have won two awards out of six nominations.

|-
|rowspan="6"|2013
|rowspan="4"|Macklemore & Ryan Lewis
|Artist of the Year
|
|-
|New Artist of the Year
|
|-
|Favorite Pop/Rock Band/Duo/Group
|
|-
|Favorite Rap/Hip-Hop Artist
|
|-
|The Heist
|Favorite Rap/Hip-Hop Album
|
|-
|"Thrift Shop"
|Single of the Year
|
|}

AIM Awards

|-
|rowspan="3"|2013
|rowspan="2"|Macklemore & Ryan Lewis
|Independent breakthrough of the year
|
|-
|PPL award for most played new independent act
|
|-
|"Thrift Shop"
|Independent video of the year
|
|-
|}

ARIA Awards
The Australian Recording Industry Association Music Awards (commonly known as ARIA Music Awards or ARIA Awards) is an annual series of awards nights celebrating the Australian music industry, put on by the [[Australian Recording Industry Association (ARIA). Macklemore & Ryan Lewis have received one nomination.

|-
||2013
|Macklemore & Ryan Lewis
|Best International Artist
|

BET Awards
The BET Awards were established in 2001 by the Black Entertainment Television (BET) network to celebrate African Americans and other minorities in music, acting, sports, and other fields of entertainment. The awards are presented annually and broadcasts live on BET. Macklemore & Ryan Lewis have won one award out of three nominations.

|-
|rowspan="2"|2013
|"Thrift Shop"
|Video of the Year
|
|-
|rowspan="2"|Macklemore & Ryan Lewis
|Best Group
|
|-
|2014
|Best Group
|
|}

BET Hip Hop Awards
The BET Hip Hop Awards are hosted annually by the Black Entertainment Television network for Hip-Hop performers, producers and music video directors. Macklemore & Ryan Lewis have received two nominations.

|-
|rowspan="2"|2013
|"Same Love"
|Impact Track
|
|-
|"Can't Hold Us"
|People's Champ Award
|
|}

Billboard Music Award
The Billboard Music Awards are sponsored by Billboard Magazine. The awards are based on sales data by Nielsen SoundScan and radio information by Nielsen Broadcast Data Systems. Macklemore & Ryan Lewis have wone two awards out of twelve nominations. 

|-
|rowspan="3"|2013
||The Heist
|Rap Album of the Year
|
|-
|rowspan="2"|"Thrift Shop"
|Rap Song of the Year
|
|-
|Top Digital Song
|
|-
|rowspan="9"|2014
|rowspan="4"|Macklemore & Ryan Lewis
|Top Duo/Group
|
|-
|Top Digital Songs Artist
|
|-
|Top Streaming Artist
|
|-
|Top Rap Artist
|
|-
|rowspan="2"|"Thrift Shop"
|Top Streaming Song (Video)
|
|-
|Top Rap Song
|
|-
|rowspan="2"|"Can't Hold Us"
|Top Streaming Song (Audio)
|
|-
|Top Rap Song
|
|-
|The Heist
|Top Rap Album
|
|}

Brit Awards
The Brit Awards are the British Phonographic Industry's pop music awards. Macklemore & Ryan Lewis have received one nomination.

|-
|2014
|Macklemore & Ryan Lewis
|International Group
|
|-
|}

Grammy Awards
The Grammy Awards are awarded annually by the National Academy of Recording Arts and Sciences of the United States. Macklemore & Ryan Lewis have won four awards out of seven nominations.

|-
|rowspan="7"|2014
|"Same Love"
|Song of the Year
|
|-
|rowspan="2"|The Heist
|Album of the Year
|
|-
|Best Rap Album
|
|-
|Macklemore & Ryan Lewis
|Best New Artist
|
|-
|rowspan="2"|"Thrift Shop"
|Best Rap Performance
|
|-
|Best Rap Song
|
|-
|"Can't Hold Us"
|Best Music Video
|
|}

iHeartRadio Music Awards
The iHeartRadio Music Awards is an international music awards show, founded by iHeartRadio in 2014, and recognizes the most popular artist and music over the past year as determined by the network's listeners. Macklemore & Ryan Lewis have received three nominations. 

|-
|rowspan="3"|2014
|rowspan="3"|Macklemore & Ryan Lewis
|Artist of the Year
|
|-
|Best New Artist
|
|-
|Best Lyrics
|
|}

Los Premios 40 Principales

|-
|rowspan="2"|2013
|Macklemore & Ryan Lewis
|Best International New Act
|
|-
|"Can't Hold Us"
|Best International Video
|
|}

Major League Soccer (MLS)
As a co-owner of Seattle Sounders FC, Macklemore is credited as being an MLS Cup Champion after the team won the title in 2019.

|-
|2019
|Macklemore
|2019 MLS Cup
|
|}

MTV Awards

MTV Europe Music Awards
The MTV Europe Music Awards (EMAs) were established in 1994 by MTV Networks Europe to celebrate the most popular singers and songs in Europe. The MTV Europe Music Awards today is a popular celebration of what MTV viewers consider the best in music. The awards are chosen by MTV viewers. Macklemore & Ryan Lewis have won two awards out of seven nominations. 

|-
|rowspan="5"|2013
|"Thrift Shop"
|Best Song
|
|-
|rowspan="5"|Macklemore & Ryan Lewis
|Best New Artist 
|
|-
|Best Hip-Hop Artist 
|
|-
|Best World Stage Performance
|
|-
|Best US Act
|
|-
|rowspan="2"|2015
|Best Look
|
|-
|"Downtown"
|Best Video
|
|}

MTV Video Music Awards
The MTV Video Music Awards (commonly abbreviated as VMA) were established in 1984 by the cable channel MTV to honor the top music videos of the year. Macklemore & Ryan Lewis have won three awards out of six nominations. 

|-
|rowspan="6"|2013
|"Thrift Shop"
|Video of the Year
|
|-
|rowspan="4"|"Can't Hold Us"
|Best Hip-Hop Video
|
|-
|Best Cinematography
|
|-
|Best Direction
|
|-
|Best Editing
|
|-
|"Same Love"
|Best Video with a Social Message
|
|}

MTV Video Music Awards Japan
The MTV Video Music Awards Japan is the Japanese version of the MTV Video Music Awards. n this event artists are awarded for their songs and videos through online voting from channel viewers. Macklemore & Ryan Lewis have received one nomination.

|-
||2014
|Same Love
|Best Hip-Hop Video
|
|}

mtvU Woodie Awards

|-
||2013
|Macklemore & Ryan Lewis
|Branching Out Woodie
|
|}

MuchMusic Video Awards
The MuchMusic Video Awards are annual awards presented by the Canadian music video channel MuchMusic to honor the year's best music videos. Macklemore & Ryan Lewis have won one award out of two nominations.

|-
||2013
|"Thrift Shop"
|International Video of the Year - Group
|
|-
|2014
|"White Walls"
|International Video of the Year - Group
|
|-
|rowspan="3"|2016
|rowspan="3"|Macklemore & Ryan Lewis
|Most Buzzworthy International Artist or Group
|
|-
|iHeartRadio International Artist or Group
|
|-
|Fan Fav International Artist or Group
|
|}

Nickelodeon Kids' Choice Awards
The Nickelodeon Kids' Choice Awards, also known as the KCAs or Kids Choice Awards, is an annual awards show that airs on the Nickelodeon cable channel, that honors the year's biggest television, movie, and music acts, as voted by Nickelodeon viewers. Macklemore & Ryan Lewis have received two nominations.

|-
||2014
|Macklemore & Ryan Lewis
|Favorite Music Group
|
|-
|2016
|"Downtown"
|Favorite Collaboration
|
|}

NRJ Music Awards
The NRJ Music Awards were created in 2000 by the radio station NRJ in a partnership with the television network TF1. They give out awards to popular musicians by different categories. Macklemore and Ryan Lewis have received two nominations.

|-
|rowspan="2"|2014
|rowspan="2"|Macklemore & Ryan Lewis
| International Duo/Group of the Year
|
|-
|International Breakthrough of the Year
|
|}

O Music Awards

|-
||2013
|Macklemore & Ryan Lewis
|Best Web-Born Artist
|
|}

People's Choice Awards
The People's Choice Awards]] is an American awards show established in 1974 that recognizes the people and the work of popular culture, and is voted on by the general public. Macklemore & Ryan Lewis have won one award.

|-
|2014
|Macklemore & Ryan Lewis
|Favorite Hip Hop Artist
|
|-
|}

Teen Choice Awards
The Teen Choice Awards were established in 1999 to honor the years biggest achievements in music. movies, sports, and television, as voted by young people aged between 13 and 19 years. Macklemore & Ryan Lewis have won two out of five nominations.  

|-
|rowspan="5"|2013
|rowspan="3"|Macklemore & Ryan Lewis
|Choice Music: Hip-Hop/Rap Artist
|
|-
|Choice Music: Breakout Group
|
|-
|Choice Summer Music Star: Group
|
|-
|| "Can't Hold Us"
|Choice Music: R&B/Hip-Hop Track
|
|-
|| "Thrift Shop"
|Choice Music: Single By A Group
|
|}

References

Macklemore
Awards
Awards